Patrick O'Flaherty CM (October 6, 1939 – August 16, 2017) was a Newfoundland and Labrador writer, historian, and academic.

He was born in Long Beach, part of Northern Bay, Conception Bay. He received a B.A. and M.A. from Memorial University of Newfoundland, and obtained his Ph.D. from University College London in 1963. After teaching at the University of Manitoba, in 1965 he joined the English department at Memorial, where he was later Professor and Head (1982-1987). He retired in 1995 and held the position of professor emeritus. He was married to Marjorie Doyle, a writer and broadcaster, and had three sons from a previous marriage.

Patrick O'Flaherty was the author of two books of short stories,  Summer of the Greater Yellowlegs (1987) and A Small Place in the Sun (1989), and two novels, Benny's Island (1994) and Priest of God (1989). In 1979 he published The Rock Observed, a survey of writing about Newfoundland and Labrador. His travel guide Come Near at your Peril (first published 1992), a sardonic but affectionate look at tourism in Newfoundland, is now in its third edition.

In collaboration with historian Peter Neary, he wrote Part of the Main: An Illustrated History of Newfoundland and Labrador (1983) and edited By Great Waters (1977), an anthology of writing about Newfoundland and Labrador.  O'Flaherty later completed three volumes on Newfoundland political history, Old Newfoundland: A History to 1843 (1999), Lost Country: The Rise and Fall of Newfoundland 1843-1933 (2005), and Leaving the Past Behind: Newfoundland History from 1934 (2011).

In 2007 he became a Member of the Order of Canada. O'Flaherty was notably part of the wide Irish diaspora in Newfoundland, and is recognized as a modern Irish contributor to literature and research.

He drowned in a swimming accident in August 2017.

References

External links 
 Appreciation by Rex Murphy 

Writers from Newfoundland and Labrador
Members of the Order of Canada
1939 births
2017 deaths